Chris  Drury (born 1948) is a British environmental artist. His body of work includes ephemeral assemblies of natural materials, land art in the mode associated with Andy Goldsworthy, as well as more permanent landscape art, works on paper and indoor installations. He also works in 3D (three-dimensional) sculpture.

Biography

Drury was born in Colombo, Sri Lanka in 1948, his family moving to the UK when he was 6 years old. From 1966, he attended Camberwell College of Arts (at the time known as Camberwell School of Arts and Crafts), studying art and sculpture, where he was taught drawing by artists such as Euan Uglow.

After being introduced to him by his dentist, in October 1975 he was invited to accompany walking artist Hamish Fulton on a journey through the Canadian Rockies which he describes as seminal in his transition from traditional sculpture and portraiture to environmental or land art.

Initially frustrated by comparisons of his work to leading land artists such as Fulton and Richard Long, his work continued to develop and in 1982 he made what he describes as a "radical departure" and spent a year creating Medicine Wheel in which he explored seasonal change and displayed objects from nature over the course of a year in the form of a large circle. Medicine Wheel was displayed through Coracle, a small independent gallery with whom Drury continued to work intermittently for a number of years, and was eventually given to Leeds City Art Gallery. Drury has largely continued to eschew traditional larger galleries, preferring to distance himself from commercial expectation and production which has allowed him a freedom to work in remote areas and in natural surroundings and to make art in a wide range of unusual collaborations.

Artworks
In addition to ephemeral works, some of Drury's lasting pieces include "cloud chambers", darkened caverns constructed of local rock, turf, or other materials. Each chamber has a hole in the roof which serves as a pinhole camera; viewers may enter the chamber and observe the image of the sky and clouds projected onto the walls and floor. He has made several around the world, with his latest, Horizon Line Chamber, constructed with master craftsman Andrew Mason, opening in 2019 at Morecambe Bay as part of the Headspace to Headlands Heritage Lottery Commission.

From December 2006 to February 2007, he was artist in residence with the British Antarctic Survey where his work included creating ephemeral pieces with the materials of nature, including Wind Vortices, ice prints and ice igloos which he also photographed.

His works in 3D sculpture include mushroom clouds evoking nuclear testing made out of as many as 6000 pieces of fungi strung floor to ceiling. These were first exhibited at his first major solo exhibition in the USA, Mushrooms | Clouds, at Nevada Museum of Art in 2008.

On paper, he uses a variety of unusual media, notably mushroom spore prints, dung, and peat, as a source of colour and patterns, which he might overlay with text or fingerprints, or underlay with maps or other geographic images.

Drury has also produced works associated with the body, working in residence with hospitals and incorporating echocardiogram data and blood into his art.

Drury is an active participant in several organisations which aim to address the effects of and challenge thinking about climate change through art, including Cape Farewell, UK, ONCA (a Brighton based charity which "supports artists and audiences to engage with environmental and social challenges" and Art Works for Change, which creates exhibitions worldwide to advocate for human rights, social justice and to highlight environmental awareness.

Carbon Sink

In 2011, Drury's outdoor artwork titled Carbon Sink created controversy when it was installed at the University of Wyoming and was ultimately censored. The sculpture was constructed of coal and burned wood and was intended to highlight the link between climate change and environmental issues in Wyoming, and the specific issue of Wyoming forests extensive infestation with pine beetle.

Complaints were received by the president of the university, Tom Buchanan, from members of the public, mining executives, Republican lobbyists and other representatives of energy industries who were aggrieved that the university displayed the sculpture whilst receiving considerable funds from state taxes. Tom Lubnau, Republican speaker of the Wyoming House of Representatives, stated he would attempt to ensure "no fossil-fuel-derived tax dollars find their way in the University of Wyoming funding stream". The sculpture was removed on Buchanan's recommendation, with the initial reason given as water damage, which the later release of Buchanan's emails contradicted. Subsequently, legislation was passed that means any proposed artwork at the university must "reflect Wyoming's history of transportation, agriculture and minerals" and be approved by the Wyoming Energy Resources Council, made up of local energy executives, and by Republican governor of Wyoming, Matt Mead. The university was criticised for backing down in the face of commercial pressure, with one professor describing the artwork's removal as an "explicit and abhorrent act of censorship".

Selected exhibitions

2010	Mushroom Cloud – Installation and Videos – Arte Sella, Italy
2010   Water, Land and Language, Taigh Chearsabhagh, Lochmaddy, Western Isles
2011	Land Water and Language, Dovecot, Edinburgh
2014	Chris Drury, Lloyds Club Gallery
2014   Chris Drury – Mini retrospective and installation – Oppland Art Centre, Lillhammer, Norway
2015	Exchange – 15 – 31 August. A Cape Farewell project with writer Kay Syrad about 3 farms in West Dorset. The Exhibition, includes a large leather bound book and several works on the wall representing a years research. The Fine Foundation Gallery, Durleston Castle, Swanage.
2016	Earth – 10 March – 3 April – A one man show at Onca Gallery, Brighton

Selected bibliography
 Also .
Land Art (2007) – Ben Tufnell, Tate Publishing
Chris Drury Mushroom|Clouds (2009) Anne M Wolfe Centre For American Places/University of Chicago Press ISBNB-13:978-1-935195-02—3
Song of The Earth: European Artists and the Landscape, (2007) –Mel Gooding and William Furlong, Thames & Hudson Ltd.; Published in USA as Artists Land Nature, Harry N. Abrams 
The Ethics of Earth Art (2010) University of Minnesota. Amanda Boetzkes 
Antarctica – Exhibition Catalogue (2012) – Chris Drury, Philip Hughes, Bea Maddock, Anne Noble, Sydney Nolan, Jan Senbergs, Jorg Schmeisser – Drill Hall Gallery, Australian National University. 
Art and Ecology Now (2014) – Andrew Brown – Thames & Hudson 
Exchange (2015) – Chris Drury and Kay Syrad -Handmade, A2 Leather-bound book, in an edition of 3, published by Cape Farewell, UK
Exchange – Chris Drury and Kay Syrad - hardback small version of above published by Cape Farewell and Little Toller Books in a limited edition together with inserted artwork: 
Exchange – Chris Drury and Kay Syrad – Paperback version of above – published by Cape Farewell and Little Toller Books:

Awards
In 2018, Drury was awarded the Lee Krasner Lifetime Achievement Award by the Pollock-Krasner Foundation.

References

Further reading

 More on the Wyoming University decision to remove Drury's sculpture, and a comparison to Indiana University's handling of pressure regarding historical murals on campus showing the Ku Klux Klan's ascendancy in the 1920s.
 Covers Drury in context with Herman de Vries, Nikolaus Lang, Richard Long and Giuseppe Penone.

British sculptors
British male sculptors
1948 births
Environmental artists
Living people
Land artists